Cryptolectica chrysalis is a moth of the family Gracillariidae. It is known from Japan (Hokkaidō, Honshū) and the Russian Far East.

The wingspan is 9–11 mm.

The larvae feed on Quercus mongolica and Quercus serrata. They probably mine the leaves of their host plant.

References

Acrocercopinae
Moths of Japan
Moths described in 1988